Justice Gray refers to Horace Gray, associate justice of the Massachusetts Supreme Judicial Court, and of the United States Supreme Court.

Justice Gray may also refer to:

John Clinton Gray (1843–1915), judge of the New York Court of Appeals
Karla M. Gray (1947–2017), chief justice of the Montana Supreme Court
Peter W. Gray (1819–1874), associate justice of the Texas Supreme Court
Hiram Gray (1801–1890), ex officio a judge of the New York Court of Appeals
Pardon Gray, associate justice of the Rhode Island Supreme Court